Jenny Søyseth (6 April 1922 – 23 June 1997) was a Norwegian politician for the Conservative Party.

She served as a deputy representative to the Parliament of Norway from Vest-Agder during the term 1973–1977. In total she met during 22 days of parliamentary session.

References

1922 births
1997 deaths
Conservative Party (Norway) politicians
Deputy members of the Storting
Politicians from Kristiansand
Women members of the Storting
20th-century Norwegian women politicians
20th-century Norwegian politicians